Marko Mićović (born 14 October 1974) is a Serbian football manager.

Coaching career
In 2017 he was worked as the caretaker manager of OFK Beograd and after that he appointed as the manager of Balzan in malta top division. In 2019 he also worked as an assistant in FK Mačva Šabac after that short spell he appointed as the manager of Rad.

References

External links

1974 births
Living people
Serbian football managers
Sportspeople from Belgrade